Paolo Carraro (born January 17, 1964) is an Italian sprint canoer who competed in the mid-1980s. He was eliminated in the semifinals of the K-1 1000 m event at the 1984 Summer Olympics in Los Angeles.

References
Sports-Reference.com profile

1964 births
Canoeists at the 1984 Summer Olympics
Italian male canoeists
Living people
Olympic canoeists of Italy
People from Intra
Sportspeople from the Province of Verbano-Cusio-Ossola